Togo competed in the 2007 All-Africa Games held at the Stade du 5 Juillet in the city of Algiers, Algeria. This was originally a bronze medal but was upgraded when second place Funke Adeoye failed a dope test.

Medal summary
Togo won a silver at the games, achieved in the Women's hammer throw. The event was held on 27 July. Subsequently, Adeoye failed a dope test and was disqualified so Ezeh was awarded the silver medal.

List of Medalists

Medal table

Silver Medal

See also
 Togo at the African Games

References

2007 in Togolese sport
Nations at the 2007 All-Africa Games
2007